Live Over Europe is the first video album by English-American hard rock band Black Country Communion. Released on October 24, 2011, the album documents the supergroup's debut tour of Europe in the summer of 2011. Produced by Kevin Shirley, who also produced the band's two studio albums, the video's track listing is made up of six tracks from Black Country and nine tracks from 2, and includes a new instrumental track in the video's introduction, a Joe Bonamassa solo song and a song from Glenn Hughes' time with Deep Purple. Live Over Europe was released as a live album on February 28, 2012.

Background and release
Footage for Live Over Europe was recorded during three shows in the German cities of Hamburg, Munich and Berlin with 14 high-definition cameras. The album was released on DVD on October 24, 2011, followed by the Blu-ray version on November 15. In addition to the 18-song live setlist, bonus features include a 28-page booklet, a 20-minute 'behind the scenes' featurette and a photo collection. From September 8, 2011 fans were able to access a free digital download of "Song of Yesterday" from the album, which was also made available on the band's Facebook event page for the release of the album. Live Over Europe was premiered in the United States on the Palladia network on October 22, 2011. The live video was also shown at a number of Vue Cinemas in the United Kingdom on November 1, which included "an exclusive filmed introduction from all four members of [the band]".

Speaking about the tour in general, producer Kevin Shirley said the following:

Reception

Reviews of Live Over Europe have been generally average. Christian Genzel for AllMusic gave the album 3.5 out of five stars. Jukebox:Metal critic Andy Lye was slightly more critical, claiming that "it should have been so much more" and noting that the presence of video interviews in between songs was unnecessary and interfering with the overall feel of the concert footage. A review on Geeks of Doom was more favourable, though, praising the quality of the material in its own right and pointing out the showmanship of frontman Glenn Hughes.

Track listing

The CD track listing incorrectly lists "I Can See Your Spirit" as being the first track on disc two.

Personnel

Black Country Communion
Glenn Hughes – bass, vocals
Joe Bonamassa – guitar, vocals
Jason Bonham – drums, backing vocals
Derek Sherinian – keyboards, synthesizers, organ

Production personnel
Kevin Shirley – production, mixing, liner notes
Warren Cracknell – engineering
Jared Kvitka – engineering
Josh De Jong – Pro Tools engineering

Additional personnel
Roy Weisman – executive production
Philippe Klose – video direction
Marcus Bird – photography and direction
Dennis Friel – graphic design
Christie Goodwin – photography

Chart positions

Video album

Live album

References

2011 video albums
2012 live albums
Black Country Communion albums
Albums produced by Kevin Shirley